Gwangsan Tak clan was one of the Korean clans. Their Bon-gwan was in Gwangju. According to the research in 2015, the number of Gwangsan Tak clan was 19551. He had an ancestor who was appointed as Podeokhu in Han dynasty. He served as Hanlin Academy in Goryeo during Seonjong of Goryeo’s reign. He began Gwangsan Tak clan because he was appointed as Prince of Gwangsan.

See also 
 Korean clan names of foreign origin

References

External links 
 

 
Korean clan names of Chinese origin